Helston Town Band is a brass band in the Cornish town of Helston.

History
Helston Town Band has a rich history, which can be traced back to the turn of the century; there are members of the current band whose family connections extend back four generations. Inevitably, during World War II the band reformed with new members and in 1946 numbers were consolidated when most of its pre-war members returned from active service. The band enjoyed steady progress at this time, which culminated in 1951 when it reached the National 3rd Section Finals at Belle Vue, Manchester.

In 1967, the band came under the direction of Edward Ashton, with whom the band gained much success and a reputation for consistently playing music to a high standard. Edward led the band to numerous successes in both local and regional contests, until his retirement in November 2002 after an incredible 35 years.

Following his retirement, the band appointed John Hitchens as their new Musical Director. The band has continued to flourish under John's direction: in 2003, they were crowned Cornish First Section Champions, and in 2004 they gained promotion to the National First Section.

In 2006, the band were crowned West of England First Section Champions, and received an invitation to compete in the National First Section Finals in Harrogate, where they achieved a commendable 7th place. The band went on to achieve third place at the West of England First Section Championships in 2007, and were delighted to become West of England First Section Champions once again in 2008.

These excellent results meant that Helston Town Band earned promotion and is competing in the Championship Section in 2009 for this first time in its entire history.

Flora Day
Helston Town Band is extremely proud of its association with Helston Flora Day, when our 'quaint old Cornish town' throngs with thousands of people. Flora Day is usually held on 8 May unless this falls on a Sunday or Monday.

Brighouse and Rastrick Band recorded its own version of 'The Floral Dance' in 1977 with the help of Terry Wogan, which reached No. 2 in the singles chart. But it is only Helston Town Band who can claim ownership of the authentic Furry Dance. Passed down through the generations of Helston bandsmen and women, no written music exists. The Flora Dance is sacred to Helston Town Band and has never been written on manuscript to ensure it remains only within the band.

On Flora Day, there are four dances throughout the day led by the band:

Early morning dance (7am): ladies in summer dresses, men in grey flannels and white shirts.
Children's dance (9.50am): Helston school children all dressed in white.
Midday dance: ladies in full-length dresses, men in morning suits and tails.
Evening dance (5pm): dress as the early morning dance.

The first and last dances are led by Helston Senior Band, who are joined by the Junior Band, Beginners Band and invited guest players for the remaining dances. In total, senior band members cover an incredible 16 miles - playing the Flora Dance nearly 1000 times.

See also

 Brass band (British style)

External links 
 Helston Town Band's website

Musicians from Cornwall
Organisations based in Cornwall
British brass bands
Helston